Rassemblement National Français (RNF) (French, 'French National Rally') was a French far-right party active between 1954 and 1957.

Rassemblement National Français was founded on 20 May 1954 by Jean-Louis Tixier-Vignancour and Maurice Bardèche, with the project of "[bringing] together all French people who wish to defend and propagate the ideas of national recovery, social reform and reconciliation among French people." It presented candidates in the 1956 French legislative election, resulting in the election of Tixier-Vignancour.

References

Bibliography 

 
 
 

Defunct political parties in France
French nationalist parties
Far-right politics in France